The International Prestige Award of Merit was given to Filipino film productions that have been recognized internationally for their superior cinematic quality and artistry.

Recipients

 1957 Badjao (LVN Pictures).
 1958 Anak Dalita (LVN Pictures)
 1960 El Legado.
 1961 Bayanihan (LVN Pictures) and My Serenade (LVN Pictures)
 1962 La Campana de Baler

References

External links

FAMAS Award